The Moravian Gate is a geomorphological feature in the Moravian region of the Czech Republic and the Upper Silesia region in Poland. It is formed by the depression between the Carpathian Mountains in the east and the Sudetes in the west. The drainage divide between the upper Oder river and the Baltic Sea in the north and the Bečva River of the Danube basin runs through it.

Geography

Because of its low altitude, the Moravian Gate has since ancient times been a natural pass between the Sudetes (Oderské vrchy range) in the northwest and the Western Carpathians (Moravian-Silesian Beskids) in the southeast. Here ran the most important trade routes, such as the Amber Road from the Baltic to the Adriatic coast, as well as roads from the Czech lands to Upper Silesia and Lesser Poland. Today the D1 highway leads from the Moravian capital Brno to Ostrava, the centre of the Moravian-Silesian Region. Further to the north the road reaches the border with Poland near the town of Racibórz and Wodzisław Śląski. The Austrian Northern Railway built in 1847 from Vienna to Bohumín also traverses the Moravian Gate.

See also 
 Vyškov Gate
 Outer Subcarpathia
 Danube–Oder Canal

External links 
  Brama Morawska at PrzyrodaPolska.pl

Mountain passes of the Czech Republic
Western Carpathians
Geography of the Moravian-Silesian Region
Moravia
Margraviate of Moravia